Tomáš Kučera (born 21 January 1985 in Liptovský Mikuláš) is a retired Slovak slalom canoeist who competed at the international level from 2001 to 2018. He competed in the C1 event until 2005. He raced in the C2 event together with Ján Bátik from 2006 until 2018, when the discipline was discontinued.

Kučera won five medals in the C2 team event at the ICF Canoe Slalom World Championships with a gold (2009), three silvers (2011, 2013, 2014) and a bronze (2007). He also won 4 golds and 2 bronzes at the European Championships.

References

12 September 2009 final results for the men's C2 team slalom event for the 2009 ICF Canoe Slalom World Championships. – accessed 12 September 2009.

External links

Living people
Slovak male canoeists
1985 births
Medalists at the ICF Canoe Slalom World Championships
Sportspeople from Liptovský Mikuláš